List of various Central Districts in Iran:

Central District (Abadan County)
Central District (Abadeh County)
Central District (Abarkuh County)
Central District (Abdanan County)
Central District (Abhar County)
Central District (Abumusa County)
Central District (Abyek County)
Central District (Ahar County)
Central District (Ahvaz County)
Central District (Ajab Shir County)
Central District (Alborz County)
Central District (Aliabad County)
Central District (Aligudarz County)
Central District (Amlash County)
Central District (Amol County)
Central District (Anar County)
Central District (Anbarabad County)
Central District (Andika County)
Central District (Andimeshk County)
Central District (Aqqala County)
Central District (Aradan County)
Central District (Arak County)
Central District (Aran va Bidgol County)
Central District (Ardabil County)
Central District (Ardakan County)
Central District (Ardal County)
Central District (Ardestan County)
Central District (Arsanjan County)
Central District (Arzuiyeh County)
Central District (Asadabad County)
Central District (Asaluyeh County)
Central District (Ashtian County)
Central District (Astaneh-ye Ashrafiyeh County)
Central District (Astara County)
Central District (Azadshahr County)
Central District (Azna County)
Central District (Babol County)
Central District (Babolsar County)
Central District (Bafq County)
Central District (Baft County)
Central District (Bagh-e Malek County)
Central District (Bahar County)
Central District (Baharestan County)
Central District (Bahmai County)
Central District (Bajestan County)
Central District (Bakharz County)
Central District (Bam County)
Central District (Bampur County)
Central District (Bandar Abbas County)
Central District (Bandar-e Anzali County)
Central District (Bandar-e-Gaz County)
Central District (Bandar Lengeh County)
Central District (Baneh County)
Central District (Bardaskan County)
Central District (Bardsir County)
Central District (Bashagard County)
Central District (Basht County)
Central District (Bastak County)
Central District (Bavanat County)
Central District (Bavi County)
Central District (Behabad County)
Central District (Behbahan County)
Central District (Behshahr County)
Central District (Bijar County)
Central District (Bileh Savar County)
Central District (Birjand County)
Central District (Bojnord County)
Central District (Bonab County)
Central District (Borkhar County)
Central District (Borujen County)
Central District (Borujerd County)
Central District (Boshruyeh County)
Central District (Bostanabad County)
Central District (Boyer-Ahmad County)
Central District (Buin va Miandasht County)
Central District (Buin Zahra County)
Central District (Bukan County)
Central District (Bushehr County)
Central District (Chadegan County)
Central District (Chah Bahar County)
Central District (Chaldoran County)
Central District (Chalus County)
Central District (Charam County)
Central District (Charuymaq County)
Central District (Chaypareh County)
Central District (Chenaran County)
Central District (Dalahu County)
Central District (Dalgan County)
Central District (Damavand County)
Central District (Damghan County)
Central District (Dana County)
Central District (Darab County)
Central District (Dargaz County)
Central District (Darmian County)
Central District (Darreh Shahr County)
Central District (Dasht-e Azadegan County)
Central District (Dashtestan County)
Central District (Dashti County)
Central District (Dehaqan County)
Central District (Dehgolan County)
Central District (Dehloran County)
Central District (Delfan County)
Central District (Delijan County)
Central District (Deylam County)
Central District (Deyr County)
Central District (Dezful County)
Central District (Divandarreh County)
Central District (Dorud County)
Central District (Eqlid County)
Central District (Esfarayen County)
Central District (Eslamabad-e Gharb County)
Central District (Eslamshahr County)
Central District (Estahban County)
Central District (Eshtehard County)
Central District (Eyvan County)
Central District (Fahraj County)
Central District (Falavarjan County)
Central District (Famenin County)
Central District (Farahan County)
Central District (Farashband County)
Central District (Faridan County)
Central District (Fariman County)
Central District (Farsan County)
Central District (Faruj County)
Central District (Faryab County)
Central District (Fasa County)
Central District (Ferdows County)
Central District (Fereydunkenar County)
Central District (Fereydunshahr County)
Central District (Firuzabad County)
Central District (Firuzeh County)
Central District (Firuzkuh County)
Central District (Fuman County)
Central District (Gachsaran County)
Central District (Galugah County)
Central District (Ganaveh County)
Central District (Garmsar County)
Central District (Gerash County)
Central District (Germi County)
Central District (Ghayen County)
Central District (Gilan-e Gharb County)
Central District (Golpayegan County)
Central District (Gonabad County)
Central District (Gonbad-e-Qabus County)
Central District (Gorgan County)
Central District (Gotvand County)
Central District (Haftgel County)
Central District (Hajjiabad County)
Central District (Hamadan County)
Central District (Harsin County)
Central District (Hashtrud County)
Central District (Hendijan County)
Central District (Heris County)
Central District (Hirmand County)
Central District (Hoveyzeh County)
Central District (Ijrud County)
Central District (Ilam County)
Central District (Iranshahr County)
Central District (Isfahan County)
Central District (Izeh County)
Central District (Jahrom County)
Central District (Jajrom County)
Central District (Jam County)
Central District (Jask County)
Central District (Javanrud County)
Central District (Jiroft County)
Central District (Joghatai County)
Central District (Jolfa County)
Central District (Jowayin County)
Central District (Juybar County)
Central District (Kabudarahang County)
Central District (Kahnuj County)
Central District (Kalaleh County)
Central District (Kalat County)
Central District (Kaleybar County)
Central District (Kamyaran County)
Central District (Kangan County)
Central District (Kangavar County)
Central District (Karaj County)
Central District (Karun County)
Central District (Kashan County)
Central District (Kashmar County)
Central District (Kavar County)
Central District (Kazerun County)
Central District (Kerman County)
Central District (Kermanshah County)
Central District (Khalilabad County)
Central District (Khalkhal County)
Central District (Khamir County)
Central District (Khash County)
Central District (Khatam County)
Central District (Khoda Afarin County)
Central District (Khodabandeh County)
Central District (Khomeyn County)
Central District (Khomeyni Shahr County)
Central District (Khondab County)
Central District (Khonj County)
Central District (Khorramabad County)
Central District (Khorrambid County)
Central District (Khorramdarreh County)
Central District (Khorramshahr County)
Central District (Khoshab County)
Central District (Khoy County)
Central District (Khur and Biabanak County)
Central District (Khvaf County)
Central District (Khvansar County)
Central District (Kiar County)
Central District (Kohgiluyeh County)
Central District (Komijan County)
Central District (Konarak County)
Central District (Kordkuy County)
Central District (Kowsar County)
Central District (Kuhbanan County)
Central District (Kuhdasht County)
Central District (Kuhrang County)
Central District (Lahijan County)
Central District (Lali County)
Central District (Lamerd County)
Central District (Langarud County)
Central District (Larestan County)
Central District (Lenjan County)
Central District (Lordegan County)
Central District (Mahabad County)
Central District (Mahallat County)
Central District (Mahmudabad County)
Central District (Mahneshan County)
Central District (Mahshahr County)
Central District (Mahvelat County)
Central District (Maku County)
Central District (Malard County)
Central District (Malayer County)
Central District (Malekan County)
Central District (Malekshahi County)
Central District (Mamasani County)
Central District (Maneh-o-Samalqan County)
Central District (Manujan County)
Central District (Maragheh County)
Central District (Marand County)
Central District (Maraveh Tappeh County)
Central District (Marivan County)
Central District (Marvdasht County)
Central District (Masal County)
Central District (Mashhad County)
Central District (Masjed Soleyman County)
Central District (Mehdishahr County)
Central District (Mehran County)
Central District (Mehrestan County)
Central District (Mehriz County)
Central District (Meshgin Shahr County)
Central District (Meyami County)
Central District (Meyaneh County)
Central District (Meybod County)
Central District (Miandoab County)
Central District (Miandorud County)
Central District (Minab County)
Central District (Minudasht County)
Central District (Mirjaveh County)
Central District (Mobarakeh County)
Central District (Mohr County)
Central District (Nahavand County)
Central District (Nain County)
Central District (Najafabad County)
Central District (Namin County)
Central District (Naqadeh County)
Central District (Narmashir County)
Central District (Natanz County)
Central District (Nazarabad County)
Central District (Nehbandan County)
Central District (Neka County)
Central District (Neyriz County)
Central District (Nik Shahr County)
Central District (Nir County)
Central District (Nishapur County)
Central District (Nowshahr County)
Central District (Nur County)
Central District (Omidiyeh County)
Central District (Oshnavieh County)
Central District (Osku County)
Central District (Pakdasht County)
Central District (Pardis County)
Central District (Parsabad County)
Central District (Parsian County)
Central District (Pasargad County)
Central District (Paveh County)
Central District (Piranshahr County)
Central District (Pishva County)
Central District (Pol-e Dokhtar County)
Central District (Poldasht County)
Central District (Qaem Shahr County)
Central District (Qaleh Ganj County)
Central District (Qarchak County)
Central District (Qasr-e Qand County)
Central District (Qasr-e Shirin County)
Central District (Qazvin County)
Central District (Qeshm County)
Central District (Qir and Karzin County)
Central District (Qods County)
Central District (Qom County)
Central District (Qorveh County)
Central District (Quchan County)
Central District (Rabor County)
Central District (Rafsanjan County)
Central District (Ramhormoz County)
Central District (Ramian County)
Central District (Ramsar County)
Central District (Ramshir County)
Central District (Rasht County)
Central District (Rashtkhvar County)
Central District (Ravansar County)
Central District (Ravar County)
Central District (Razan County)
Central District (Rey County)
Central District (Rezvanshahr County)
Central District (Rigan County)
Central District (Robat Karim County)
Central District (Rostam County)
Central District (Rudan County)
Central District (Rudbar County)
Central District (Rudbar Jonubi County)
Central District (Rudsar County)
Central District (Sabzevar County)
Central District (Saduq County)
Central District (Sahneh County)
Central District (Salas-e Babajani County)
Central District (Salmas County)
Central District (Sanandaj County)
Central District (Saqqez County)
Central District (Sarab County)
Central District (Sarakhs County)
Central District (Saravan County)
Central District (Sarayan County)
Central District (Sarbaz County)
Central District (Sarbisheh County)
Central District (Sardasht County)
Central District (Sareyn County)
Central District (Sari County)
Central District (Sarpol-e Zahab County)
Central District (Sarvabad County)
Central District (Sarvestan County)
Central District (Savadkuh County)
Central District (Saveh County)
Central District (Savojbolagh County)
Central District (Selseleh County)
Central District (Semirom County)
Central District (Semnan County)
Central District (Sepidan County)
Central District (Shabestar County)
Central District (Shadegan County)
Central District (Shaft County)
Central District (Shahin Dezh County)
Central District (Shahin Shahr and Meymeh County)
Central District (Shahr-e Babak County)
Central District (Shahrekord County)
Central District (Shahreza County)
Central District (Shahriar County)
Central District (Shahrud County)
Central District (Shazand County)
Central District (Shiraz County)
Central District (Shirvan and Chardaval County)
Central District (Shirvan County)
Central District (Shush County)
Central District (Shushtar County)
Central District (Siahkal County)
Central District (Sib and Suran County)
Central District (Simorgh County)
Central District (Sirjan County)
Central District (Sonqor County)
Central District (Sorkheh County)
Central District (Sowme'eh Sara County)
Central District (Tabas County)
Central District (Tabriz County)
Central District (Tafresh County)
Central District (Taft County)
Central District (Takab County)
Central District (Takestan County)
Central District (Taleqan County)
Central District (Talesh County)
Central District (Tangestan County)
Central District (Tarom County)
Central District (Taybad County)
Central District (Tehran County)
Central District (Tiran and Karun County)
Central District (Tonekabon County)
Central District (Torbat-e-Heydarieh County)
Central District (Torbat-e-Jam County)
Central District (Torkaman County)
Central District (Tuyserkan County)
Central District (Urmia County)
Central District (Varamin County)
Central District (Varzaqan County)
Central District (Yazd County)
Central District (Zabol County)
Central District (Zahedan County)
Central District (Zanjan County)
Central District (Zarand County)
Central District (Zarandieh County)
Central District (Zarrin Dasht County)
Central District (Zaveh County)
Central District (Zehak County)
Central District (Zirkuh County)

See also 
 Central District (disambiguation)
 

Central District